Jeff(rey) or Geoffrey Gilbert may refer to:

Musicians
Geoffrey Gilbert, English flautist
Jeffrey Gilbert (musician), American musician and a member of Christian rock band Kutless

Others
Jeffrey Gilbert (judge) (1674–1726), English judge, active in Ireland and England, and writer of legal treatises
Jeff Gilbert (police officer), police chief of Quartzsite, Arizona, 2004–2013

See also
Gilbert (surname)